Cyril Henry Trailor (15 May 1919 – 28 August 1986) was a Welsh professional footballer who played for Northfleet United, Tottenham Hotspur,  Leyton Orient, Bedford Town and represented Wales at schoolboy level.

Playing career
Trailor impressed Tottenham Hotspur while playing for Wales schoolboys in 1932 and was invited to join the club's junior side. He later earned an amateur contract. At the age of 16 he signed professional forms with the club's "nursery" team Northfleet United. In October 1938 Trailor was offered a professional contract with the Spurs. During World War II he served with the Royal Artillery. He was wounded during the retreat from Dunkirk and returned to service on recovery. On several occasions he turned out for Tottenham in war–time matches. The wing half returned to the club in 1946 and went on to feature in 12 senior matches in all competitions. He also featured in 118 games and scored 24 goals at various levels at White Hart Lane. In August 1948 Leyton Orient paid £600 for his services where he notched up a further 39 appearances. After leaving Brisbane Road he joined Bedford Town where an ankle injury ended his competitive career after making 46 appearances and scoring two goals between 1950–51.

Post–playing career
After his football career had ended Trailor returned to his home town of Merthyr Tydfil where he was employed at the town's Hoover plant. Trailor died in Merthyr on 28 August 1986.

References

1919 births
1986 deaths
Footballers from Merthyr Tydfil
Welsh footballers
English Football League players
Ebbsfleet United F.C. players
Tottenham Hotspur F.C. players
Leyton Orient F.C. players
Bedford Town F.C. players
Association football wing halves
British Army personnel of World War II
Royal Artillery personnel
Welsh military personnel